Sedmi svet is a novel by Slovenian author Sebastjan Koleša. It was first published in 2009.

See also
List of Slovenian novels

References

Slovenian novels
2009 novels